Antanava (from the Lithuanian name Antanas 'Anthony') could refer to several Lithuanian villages:
 
 Antanava, Debeikiai, in Debeikiai Eldership of Anykščiai District Municipality
 Antanava, Kavarskas, in Kavarskas Eldership of Anykščiai District Municipality
 Antanava, Anykščiai, in Kurkliai Eldership of Anykščiai District Municipality
 Antanava, Jurbarkas, in Jurbarkas District Municipality
 Antanava, Kaunas, in Kaunas District Municipality
 Antanava, Gudžiūnai, in Gudžiūnai Eldership of Kėdainiai District Municipality
 Antanava, Josvainiai, in Josvainiai Eldership of Kėdainiai District Municipality
 Antanava, Kelmė, in Kelmė District Municipality
 Antanava, Mažeikiai, in Mažeikiai District Municipality
 Antanava, Alanta, in Alanta Eldership of Molėtai District Municipality
 Antanava, Balninkai, in Balninkai Eldership of Molėtai District Municipality
 Antanava, Dubingiai, in Dubingiai Eldership of Molėtai District Municipality
 Antanava, Luokesa, in Luokesa Eldership of Molėtai District Municipality
 Antanava, Panevėžys, in Panevėžys District Municipality
 Antanava, Aukštelkai, in Aukštelkai Eldership of Radviliškis District Municipality
 Antanava, Sidabravas, in Sidabravas Eldership of Radviliškis District Municipality
 Antanava, Raseiniai, in Raseiniai District Municipality
 Antanava, Rokiškis, in Rokiškis District Municipality
 Antanava, Švenčionys, in Švenčionys District Municipality
 Antanava, Zarasai, in Zarasai District Municipality.

See also
Antonov (disambiguation)
Antonowo
Antonovo